Mārsnēni Parish is an administrative unit of Cēsis Municipality in the Vidzeme region of Latvia.

Towns, villages and settlements of Mārsnēni Parish 
  - parish administrative center.

References 

Parishes of Latvia
Cēsis Municipality
Vidzeme